Robert J. Litt is an American sound engineer. He was nominated for three Academy Awards in the category Best Sound. He worked on over 160 films between 1964 and 2000.

Selected filmography
 Mississippi Burning (1988)
 The Shawshank Redemption (1994)
 The Green Mile (1999)

References

External links

Year of birth missing (living people)
Living people
American audio engineers
Best Sound BAFTA Award winners